Antonio Rivera Galarza (born 24 February 1967) is a Mexican equestrian. He competed in the individual dressage event at the 2000 Summer Olympics.

References

External links
 
 
 

1967 births
Living people
Mexican male equestrians
Olympic equestrians of Mexico
Equestrians at the 2000 Summer Olympics
Equestrians at the 1995 Pan American Games
Equestrians at the 1999 Pan American Games
Equestrians at the 2003 Pan American Games
Equestrians at the 2011 Pan American Games
Pan American Games gold medalists for Mexico
Pan American Games bronze medalists for Mexico
Pan American Games medalists in equestrian
Place of birth missing (living people)
Medalists at the 1995 Pan American Games
Medalists at the 1999 Pan American Games
Medalists at the 2003 Pan American Games